Andrey Andreyev or Andrey Andreev may refer to:

 Andrey Andreyevich Andreyev (1895–1971), Soviet politician
 Andrey Andreev (born 1974), Russian businessman, founder of Badoo
 Andrey Anatoliyevich Andreyev (born 1976), Russian politician
 Andrey Matveyevich Andreyev (1905–1983), Soviet Colonel general and Hero of the Soviet Union
 Andrey Vladimirovich Andreyev, Russian diplomat and current Ambassador of Russia to Qatar